Joyce Sutphen (born August 10, 1949) is an American poet who served as Minnesota's Poet Laureate from 2011 to 2021. She was the state's second laureate, appointed by Governor Mark Dayton in August, 2011 to succeed Robert Bly. Sutphen is professor emerita of English at Gustavus Adolphus College in St. Peter, Minnesota.

Life
Sutphen was raised in Saint Joseph, Minnesota, and currently resides in the city of Chaska. She holds degrees from the University of Minnesota, including her Ph.D. in Renaissance Drama.

Her first book of poetry, Straight Out of View (Beacon Press, 1995), won the Barnard New Women's Poets Prize. Her second, Coming Back to the Body (Holy Cow! Press, 2000), was a finalist for a Minnesota Book Award, and her third, Naming the Stars (2004), also from Holy Cow! Press, won the Minnesota Book Award in Poetry.

In 2005, Red Dragonfly Press published a fine press edition of Fourteen Sonnets. Her poems have appeared in American Poetry Review, Poetry, The Gettysburg Review, Water~Stone, Hayden's Ferry, Shenandoah, Luna.

Prizes
 1994 Barnard Women Poets Prize
 2005 Minnesota Book Award for Poetry

Bibliography

Poetry
 Straight Out of View (Beacon Press 1995) 
 Coming Back to the Body (Holy Cow! Press 2000) 
 Naming the Stars (Holy Cow! Press 2004) 
 First Words (Red Dragonfly Press 2010) 
 After Words (Red Dragonfly Press 2013) 
 Modern Love & Other Myths (Red Dragonfly Press 2015) 
 "The Green House" (Salmon Poetry 2017) 
 "Carrying Water to the Field. New and Selected Poems" (University of Nebraska Press 2019)

Chapbooks
 Fourteen Sonnets (Red Dragonfly Press 2005)

Anthologies
 To Sing Along the Way: Minnesota Women Poets from Pre-Territorial Days to the Present, Joyce Sutphen, Connie Wanek, Thom Tammaro, eds. (New Rivers Press 2006) 
 180 More: Extraordinary Poems for Every Day, Billy Collins, ed. (Random House 2005) 
 Boomer Girls: Poems by Women from the Baby Boom Generation, Pamela Gemin and Paula Sergi, eds. (University of Iowa Press 1999)

References

External links
 

1949 births
Living people
Gustavus Adolphus College faculty
People from St. Joseph, Minnesota
Poets Laureate of Minnesota
Poets from Minnesota
American women poets
People from Chaska, Minnesota
University of Minnesota alumni
20th-century American poets
20th-century American women writers
21st-century American poets
21st-century American women writers